Robledo is both a surname and a given name. Notable people with the name include:

Carmelo Robledo (1912 – c. 1981), Argentine boxer
Francisco Robledo (1909–?), Mexican hammer thrower
George Robledo (1926–1989), Chilean athlete
Gonzalo Robledo (born 1987), Argentine footballer
Hania Robledo, Oscar nominated art director
Irene Robledo (1890–1988), Mexican educator and humanist
Jorge Robledo (1500–1546), Spanish conquistador
José María Robledo (born 1939), Argentine Olympic rower
Juan Robledo (born 1979), Chilean footballer
Lorenzo Robledo (1921–2006), Spanish actor
Marcelo Robledo (born 1978), Argentine footballer
Reev Robledo, music composer
Ted Robledo (1928–1970), Chilean footballer

Given name:
Robledo Puch (born 1952), Argentine serial killer